Bleeders may refer to:

 Bleeders (band), a hardcore band from New Zealand
 The Bleeders (album), 2005
 Bleeders (album), 2008
 Bleeders (film), a 1997 Canadian horror film
 "Bleeders", a song from The Wallflowers' 1996 album Bringing Down the Horse

See also
Bleeding (disambiguation)